Medulla or Medullary may refer to:

Science
 Medulla oblongata, a part of the brain stem  
 Renal medulla, a part of the kidney
 Adrenal medulla, a part of the adrenal gland
 Medulla of ovary, a stroma in the center of the ovary
 Medulla of the thymus, a part of the lobes of the thymus
 Medulla of lymph node
 Medulla (hair), the innermost layer of the hair shaft
 Medulla, a part of the optic lobe of arthropods
 Medulla (lichenology), a layer of the internal structure of a lichen
 Pith, or medulla, a tissue in the stems of vascular plants

Other uses
 Medúlla, a 2004 album by Björk
 Medulla, Florida, a place in the U.S.
 Las Médulas, a gold mining site in León, Spain

See also

 
Medullary cavity, the central cavity of bone shafts
 Medullary ray (disambiguation)
 Medulla Grammatice, a fifteenth-century Latin–Middle English glossary